Johan Nicolai Trock Hartling (born 17 January 1994 in Hørsholm) is a Danish hurdler.

He established several national records on 400 m hurdles, the last one of 50.01, finishing third at 2019 European Team Championships.

References

External links
IAAF Athlete’s profile

Danish male hurdlers
1994 births
Living people
European Games competitors for Denmark
Athletes (track and field) at the 2019 European Games
People from Hørsholm Municipality
Sportspeople from the Capital Region of Denmark